Frisian Blood (German: Friesenblut) is a 1925 German silent film directed by Fred Sauer and starring Jenny Jugo, Gustav Fröhlich and Hans Adalbert Schlettow.

The film's sets were designed by the art director Willi Herrmann.

Cast
 Jenny Jugo as Marlem Larsen 
 Gustav Fröhlich as Jörg Larsen Fischer 
 Hans Adalbert Schlettow as Klaus Detlefsen 
 Fritz Alberti
 Frieda Lehndorf as Stine Larsen 
 Philipp Manning as Christian Boos 
 Grete Reinwald as Antje Boos

References

Bibliography
 Bock, Hans-Michael & Bergfelder, Tim. The Concise Cinegraph: Encyclopaedia of German Cinema. Berghahn Books, 2009.

External links

1925 films
Films of the Weimar Republic
German silent feature films
Films directed by Fred Sauer
German black-and-white films
Phoebus Film films